Cryptorhamphidae is a family of true bugs in the order Hemiptera. There are at least two genera and four described species in Cryptorhamphidae.

Genera
These two genera belong to the family Cryptorhamphidae:
 Cryptorhamphus Stal, 1859
 Gonystus Stal, 1874

References

Further reading

 
 

Lygaeoidea
Heteroptera families